Kruger National Park Commando was a light infantry regiment of the South African Army. It formed part of the South African Army Infantry Formation as well as the South African Territorial Reserve.

History

Origin

Operations

With the SADF
Kruger National Park Commando (KNPC) was based in the Kruger National Park and had 4 small base camps situated at:
Crocodile Bridge,
Sandriver near Skukuza,
Shishangane near Nwanetsi and
Masakosapan near Shingwedzi.

Each base was more or less of platoon strength with Sandriver as the headquarters.

The main role of the KNPC was daily foot patrols from south to north interdicting refugees and smugglers from Mozambique.

With the SANDF

Disbandment
This unit, along with all other Commando units was disbanded after a decision by South African President Thabo Mbeki to disband all Commando Units. The Commando system was phased out between 2003 and 2008 "because of the role it played in the apartheid era", according to the Minister of Safety and Security Charles Nqakula.

Operation Corona
The role the KNPC fulfilled was eventually reactivated in the SANDF by Operation Corona.

Unit Insignia

Leadership

References

See also 
 South African Commando System

Infantry regiments of South Africa
South African Commando Units